Penwith Hundred was one of ten ancient administrative hundreds of the county of Cornwall, England, UK. The ancient hundred of Penwith was larger than the local government district of Penwith (1974–2009) which took its name. Daphne du Maurier in Vanishing Cornwall suggests that the name, Penwith, has three renderings, "the last promontory," "promontory on the left, and "the headland of slaughter," thus suggesting that this area might have been the site of prehistoric invasions of sea-borne fighters, or perhaps tribal battles. The eastern part became part of Kerrier District.

All of the Hundreds of Cornwall belonged, and still belong, to the Duchy of Cornwall apart from Penwith which belonged to the Arundells of Lanherne. The Arundells sold it to the Hawkins family in 1813 and the Hawkins' went on to sell it to the Paynters in 1832. The Lordship of Penwith came with a great number of rights over the entire hundred. These included: rights to try certain cases of trespass, trespass on the law, debt and detinue, to appoint a jailor for the detention of persons apprehended, to receive high-rent from the lords of the principal manors and to claim the regalia of the navigable rivers and havens, the profits of the royal gold and silver mines, and all wrecks, escheats, deodands, treasure trove, waifs, estrays, goods of felons and droits of admiralty happening within the hundred.

The main settlement was Penzance . Other settlements within the area included St Ives, Hayle, St Just in Penwith, Camborne and Marazion. The institutions of the Penwith hundred were originally centred in the parish of Gwithian and were moved to Penzance in 1771 (or earlier) following large successive inundations of in blown sand. There are records of a number of institutions attached to the Penwith Hundred including a Hundred Gaol (maintained for civil debtors), a Hundred Pound for stray animals and a Hundred Court.

The parishes of the Penwith hundred were Camborne, Crowan, St Buryan, Gulval (or Lanisly), Gwinear, Gwithian, Illogan, Lelant (or Uny Lelant), Ludgvan, Madron, Morvah, Paul, Perranuthnoe, Phillack, Redruth, St Erth, St Hilary, St Ives, St Just-in-Penwith, St Levan, Sancreed, Sennen, Towednack, Zennor.

References 

 Priestland, Gerald & Sylvia (1980) West of Hayle River (new edition 1992 as Priestland's Cornwall)
 

History of Cornwall
Hundreds of Cornwall